Citizens Bank Financial Center is an architectural landmark in downtown Wilkes-Barre, Pennsylvania. It was designed by the architect D.H. Burnham and completed in 1911. An illuminated sign has sat atop the building since 1912.

Description

Building architecture 
It was built as the headquarters for the Miner's National Bank but over the years has had a number of owners, including the United Penn Bank and Mellon Bank. The building features a recess, giving it an "H" shape. Atop the second floor, a sculpture of a nesting eagle and a flag pole can be seen from the Franklin Street side of the building. A frieze at the top of the building is decorated with lion heads and a number of interesting embellishments can be seen climbing the facade.

Signage 
In 1912, an illuminated sign was placed atop the building by the Miners National Bank. In 2013, Citizens Bank moved from the building after more than a decade, and while the building now houses offices and apartments, the Citizens Bank sign remains.

References 

Buildings and structures in Wilkes-Barre, Pennsylvania
Burnham and Root buildings
Residential skyscrapers in Pennsylvania
Skyscraper office buildings in Pennsylvania
Skyscrapers in Pennsylvania
Office buildings completed in 1911